Ryszard Prostak (born 15 August 1957) is a Polish former basketball player. He competed in the men's tournament at the 1980 Summer Olympics.

References

1957 births
Living people
Polish men's basketball players
Olympic basketball players of Poland
Basketball players at the 1980 Summer Olympics
Sportspeople from Wrocław